The following is a list of episodes for the television show She Spies.

Series overview

Episodes

Season 1 (2002–03)

Season 2 (2003–04)

External links
 

She Spies